The 2001 Hamilton Tiger-Cats season was the 44th season for the team in the Canadian Football League and their 52nd overall. The Tiger-Cats finished in 2nd place in the East Division with an 11–7 record but lost to the powerhouse Winnipeg Blue Bombers in the East Final.

Offseason

CFL Draft

Preseason

Regular season

Season standings

Schedule

Postseason

Awards and honours

2001 CFL All-Stars
Rob Hitchcock - Safety
Joe Montford - Defensive End
Paul Osbaldiston - Kicker
Chris Shelling - Linebacker

References

Hamilton Tiger-Cats seasons
Hamilton